The Madjars or Madi-yar people are a Turkic ethnic group in Kazakhstan. They number about 1,000–2,000 and live mostly in the Kostanay Region.

Ethnonym
Turkologist scholar Dr. Imre Baski claims that the ethnonym Madjar means 'faithful Muslim', literally 'friend or follower of Muhammad', ultimately from Muhammad-i-yar.

Genetics
The Madjars have sometimes been linked onomastically to the Magyars (Hungarians); proponents of this view include supporters of "Hungarian Turanism", such as András Zsolt Bíró, who noticed the high frequency of Y-DNA Haplogroup G-M201 among Madiyars and the presence of Haplogroup G amongst Hungarians. However, it is not supported by any strong material evidence. In fact, haplogroup G is rare in Hungary (at a rate around 3%) and has much higher rates in parts of Western and Southern Europe (e.g. Italy and France). Southern German populations also have a higher rate of Haplogroup G than the Hungarian population. Furthermore, Turkologist Imre Baski concluded that the Kazakh clan name Madi-yar "cannot possibly be linked to the Magyar ethnonym and thus cannot serve as proof for a relationship between Madiyar and Magyar."

Footnotes

Bibliography
 Nándor Dreisziger. 2011. "Genetic Research and Hungarian 'Deep Ancestry'": p. 3.
 D. Vanek, et al." 2009. "Kinship and Y-Chromosome Analysis of 7th Century Human Remains: Novel DNA Extraction and Typing Procedure for Ancient Material". Croatian Medical Journal, 50:3, pp. 286–95.

Ethnic groups in Kazakhstan
Turkic peoples of Asia